Matteo Simoni (born 3 September 1987) is a Belgian actor. He starred in film such as Marina, The Racer, and Safety First: The Movie.

Awards and nominations

References

External links

Flemish male film actors
Flemish male television actors
1987 births
Living people
21st-century Flemish male actors
Belgian people of Italian descent
People from Hasselt